Paul Kiptoo Masaba  is an Anglican bishop in Uganda: he has been Bishop of Sebei since 2015. 

Masaba was educated at Uganda Christian University. Also a teacher, he has served as a lay reader, a priest and an archdeacon. He was consecrated a bishop on 12 April 2015, at St Peter's Cathedral, Kokwomurya, Kapchorwa.

References

21st-century Anglican bishops in Uganda
Anglican bishops of Sebei
Uganda Christian University alumni
Anglican archdeacons in Africa
Ugandan educators
Year of birth missing (living people)
Living people